Themeda triandra is a species of perennial tussock-forming grass widespread in Africa, Australia, Asia and the Pacific. In Australia it is commonly known as kangaroo grass and in East Africa and South Africa it is known as red grass and red oat grass or as rooigras in Afrikaans. Kangaroo grass was formerly thought to be one of two species, and was named Themeda australis.

The plant has traditional uses as food and medicine in Africa and Australia. Indigenous Australians harvested it to make bread and string for fishing nets around 30,000 years ago. It was used as livestock feed in early colonial Australia, but this use was largely replaced by introduced plants.  there is a large government-funded project under way to investigate the possibility of growing kangaroo grass commercially in Australia for use as a regular food source for humans.

Description
It flowers in summer, producing large red-brown spikelets on branched stems. The column of lemma's awn is hispidulous and twisted.

Its leaves are a grey-green colour in winter, turning red-brown in summer. The blooms exuding a strong perfume.

Taxonomy and naming
Themeda triandra was first formally described in 1775 by Peter Forsskål who published the description in Flora Aegyptiaco-Arabica. There are many synonyms of this species. The specific epithet (triandra) is the feminine of the Botanical Latin adjective triandrus, meaning "with three stamens", based on the Greek-derived combining forms tri-, three, and -andrus, male.

Kangaroo grass was formerly thought to be one of two species, and was named Themeda australis.

Distribution and habitat
Themeda triandra is found across Asia, Africa, Australia, and the Pacific. In Australia, it is found in all of the states and territories. It grows predominantly in grassland and open woodland communities. It is a significant species in temperate grasslands in Australia, a habitat considered to be endangered or threatened in various parts of the country. It does not do well under heavy grazing pressure, but benefits from occasional fire.

It tolerates sandy or clay soils, is drought-tolerant, and can grow in full sun to partial shade.

Uses
The young growth is palatable to livestock. It serves as a food source for several avian species, including the long-tailed widowbird, and is occasionally used as an ornamental plant.

Traditionally, in Uganda, the hollow stems of the grass are used as a thatch  in hut construction, and for creating pulp for paper. T. triandra seed has also been used as a famine food in Africa. In West Africa, the root are used in the creation of a medicine used to treat dysmenorrhoea (painful periods).

In Australia, it is sometimes used as an ornamental plant in rockeries, as a substitute for a lawn, and in cooking. It has also been found to be useful in treating horses for obesity, insulin resistance, and foot inflammation, because it is lower in carbohydrates such as sugar, starch, and fructans than introduced grasses.

Before the colonisation of Australia, kangaroo grass used to be harvested by Aboriginal Australians, who used the leaves and stems for making string, the basis for fishing nets, as well as for food. The grains were harvested and ground into flour and porridge; the flour was used to make a traditional bread (later referred to as damper, although that term is mostly used for the bread made by non-Indigenous Australians), said to have a nutty flavour. Evidence has been found of this food production occurring around 30,000 years ago, with the grain considered to be a staple food and especially valuable in arid areas.

However, in recent years kangaroo grass has been looked upon as a weed which is sometimes eaten by livestock. , a four-year research project supported by the Australian Government is being undertaken by researcher Dylan Male, at La Trobe University in collaboration with the Dja Dja Wurrung Aboriginal Clans Corporation of central Victoria, investigating the possibility of developing it as a food crop.  It is hoped that kangaroo grass would be able to be grown on a commercial scale and become a regular food source. They have found tussocks of the grass estimated to be over 50 years old, an possibly unique among Australian grasses. The plant has several advantages over currently farmed grains:
it can survive on land depleted by farming;
it is very drought-resistant;
it tolerates extreme changes in temperature;
it is a perennial grass;
it can help to restore already degraded grasslands;
contains 40 per cent more protein than traditional grains used for making bread; and
because of the way it grows, forming a very dense tussock with its leaves bending outwards, it protects the soil and creates its own little ecosystem – it conserves moisture, creating habitat for small animals such as native insects and invertebrates.

The project will draw heavily on the knowledge of the traditional owners of the land, and there will be ongoing communication with farmers and Landcare Australia groups.

The project follows a smaller, crowdfunded project undertaken in 2017 by writer Bruce Pascoe on his own property in Gipsy Point, eastern Victoria,  managed by volunteers, to develop several Indigenous Australian food crops, including murnong (yam daisy), kangaroo grass and native raspberries.

References

External links

PlantZAfrica.com - Themeda triandra

Andropogoneae
Grasses of Africa
Grasses of Asia
Grasses of South Africa
Poales of Australia
Flora of New South Wales
Flora of the Northern Territory
Flora of Queensland
Flora of South Australia
Flora of Tasmania
Flora of Victoria (Australia)
Angiosperms of Western Australia
Forages
Taxa named by Peter Forsskål